Na Phak Khuang railway station is a railway station located in Kamnoet Nopphakun Subdistrict, Bang Saphan District, Prachuap Khiri Khan in Thailand.

Train services 
 Ordinary 254/255 Lang Suan-Thon Buri-Lang Suan

References 
 
 

Railway stations in Thailand